Powell Township is a township in Comanche County, Kansas, USA. At the 2000 census, its population was 89.

Geography
According to the USGS, it contains one cemetery, Powell Township.

The streams of Dunlap Creek, Jim Creek, Skelton Creek and Spring Creek run through this township.

References
 USGS Geographic Names Information System (GNIS)

External links
 US-Counties.com
 City-Data.com

Townships in Comanche County, Kansas
Townships in Kansas